Wayne Bell is a bulletin board pioneer

Wayne Bell may also refer to:
Wayne Bell (musician), percussionist and contributor to film music, performer on Drive
Wayne Bell (rally driver), Australian rally driver in 1978 World Rally Championship season